Tania Gunadi (born 29 July 1983)
 is an Indonesian-American actress and producer. She moved to Los Angeles when she was a teenager.

Biography
Gunadi was born in Bandung, Indonesia. She won a green card lottery when she was a teenager and moved to Los Angeles. When she first came to the US, she attended a free program for adult ESL students to learn English. She then went to university in Los Angeles.  Her first job was working at Pizza Hut as a telephone operator. Gunadi then decided to pursue an acting career after she landed a part in a Disneyland commercial.

Filmography

Film

Television

Video games

Commercials

References

External links

1983 births
Living people
Actresses from Los Angeles
Actresses from West Java
American film actresses
American television actresses
American video game actresses
American voice actresses
American web series actresses
Indonesian emigrants to the United States
Indonesian people of Chinese descent
People from Bandung
21st-century American actresses